Perry Como in Italy is Perry Como's 14th RCA Victor 12" long-play album.

"In Italy" was recorded at the RCA Italiana studios in Rome with arrangements by Nick Perito and choral direction by Ray Charles.

Track listing
Side 1
"Souvenir d'Italie"
"Oh Marie"
"Cominciamo ad amarci"
"Love Theme from "La Strada"" ( Traveling Down a Lonely Road )
"Forget Domani"
"Anema e core"
    
Side 2
"Un giorno dopo l'altro" ( One day after another)
"Santa Lucia"
"E Lei" ( And You )
"Toselli's Serenade" ( Dreams and Memories )
"O Marenariello"
"Arrivederci Roma" ( Goodbye Rome )

References

External links
Perry Como Discography

Perry Como albums
1966 albums
RCA Victor albums